The Fraser Plateau and Basin Complex is an ecoregion, as defined by the World Wildlife Fund.  It encompasses the middle reaches of the watershed of the Fraser River as it traverses the northern part of the Interior Plateau of British Columbia.  The WWF ecoregion is similar in description to  two of the ecoregions within Environment Canada's  Montane Cordillera Ecozone: The Fraser Basin and the Fraser Plateau. Much of the Fraser Plateau is underlain by volcanic rocks which have steep escarpments along rivers and creeks and almost flat upper surfaces.

Physiographically, the Fraser Basin is a section of the larger Northern Plateaus province, which in turn is part of the larger Intermontane Plateaus physiographic division.

See also
List of ecoregions in Canada (WWF)

References

External links
 
 Environment Canada Montane Cordillera Ecozone

Temperate coniferous forests
Ecozones and ecoregions of British Columbia
Forests of British Columbia
Central Interior of British Columbia
Fraser River
Interior Plateau
Natural history of British Columbia
Physiographic sections
Nearctic ecoregions